Quzhd may refer to:
 Quzhd, Gonabad
 Quzhd, Kashmar

See also
Quzhdabad